(in Occitan classical norm, Dafnís e Alcimadura, or according to the original libretto spelling, Daphnis e Alcimaduro) is an opera by the Baroque violinist, conductor and composer Jean-Joseph Cassanéa de Mondonville  to a libretto in the Occitan language, written by the composer himself and loosely inspired by La Fontaine's fable bearing the same title. It takes the form of a pastorale in three acts and was later endowed with a prologue in French entitled Les jeux floraux, to a libretto by Claude-Henri de Fusée de Voisenon.

History, criticism and interpretation 
The opera was first staged on 24 October and 5 November 1754 at the Palace of Fontainebleau and performed before King Louis XV of France and his court. It was quite successful and the last act duet was repeated as an encore. Its public premiere was held by the Paris Opéra at the Théâtre du Palais-Royal on 29 December 1754, when the French prologue was added.

Mondonville asked two stars of the Paris Opéra to perform his work: the prima donna Marie Fel from Bordeaux and the primo uomo Pierre Jélyotte from Béarn. Both Bordeaux and Béarn are traditionally Occitan-speaking regions, though of Gascon and Béarnais dialects, whereas Mondonville wrote in the Languedocien dialect. The third role of the pastorale, Jeanet, was assigned to another tenor of the company, generally known as Latour, who was born in Occitania as well, possibly at Carcassonne.

The opera was composed during the Querelle des Bouffons, an argument between partisans of French and Italian music. Mondonville supported the former, and according to Théodore Lajarte, he was prompted to employ his native Languedoc dialect because he intended to consolidate his leadership of the French faction. The German-born critic Melchior Grimm, a supporter of Italian music (and therefore not an admirer of Mondonville), approved the use of the Occitan language, as it was closer to Italian and thus partly able to camouflage the insipidity of Mondonville's work.

Daphnis et Alcimadure received a favourable review in the Mercure de France and the degree of its success may be gauged by the fact that it inspired several parodies: Jérôme et Fanchonnette ou Anacréon à la Grenouillère, "pastorale poissarde" (billingsgate pastorale) by Jean-Joseph Vadé (1719–1757), which was given at the  Foire St Germain on 18 February 1755; Daphnis et Alcimadure performed in May 1756; Les Amours de Mathurine, "in two acts mêlés d'ariettes", by Jacques Lacombe (1724–1801), mounted at the Théatre Italien on 10 June 1756; and finally a work titled Alcimatendre, by Jean-François Mussot, called Arnould, (1734–1795), performed in 1773.

In 1762 the Paris Opéra considered reviving the opera, and, since all the Occitan-speaking first performers had retired from the company, Pierre Jéliotte, who was still active at Court (as was Marie Fel), was offered the considerable sum of 24,000 livres for 24 performances to be held at the Théâtre du Palais-Royal. The great tenor however was only waiting for the king's leave to retire permanently to his native region and refused the offer. The lack of native-speaking singers forced Mondonville to prepare a French translation of his opera, which, however, was not staged for the time being. On the contrary, two years later the original Occitan version was mounted again at Court, with Jéliotte and Fel singing the title roles and the newly engaged comic tenor of the Comédie-Italienne, Antoine Trial, who came from Avignon, replacing Latour as Jeanet. The French version had to wait until 1768 to be staged, but did not earn much applause. It was however revived again on 17 March 1773, "but it had lost its novelty, and it had to be dropped from the repertory after its 12th representation in French at the Opéra", thus following the fate awaiting shortly the generality of old pre-Gluckian repertoire.

Dialect versions were performed on several occasions in the south of France, where the Occitan language was still widely used: at Montpellier and Toulouse performances of the opera, now styled a "pastouralo toulouzeno", were respectively held again in 1778 (with a text "adjusted to our patois of Montpellier"), and in 1786 and 1789 (both times at the Capitole de Toulouse).

Mondonville's Occitan opera was again performed (with decors by Jean Hugo) in Montpellier in 1981 and recorded. It was later produced in 1994–1996 by the Festival Déodat de Séverac at Montauban and Saint Félix Lauragais. In 1999 some extracts were included in a CD reconding entitled Musiques aux États du Languedoc.

Roles

Synopsis

Prologue
The prologue, in French, invokes Clémence Isaure (the allegorical patroness of Occitan) as well as the Jeux Floraux as a way of evoking the idealised history of the Occitan language. After the prologue, the opera is wholly in Occitan.

Act 1
Daphnis is a young shepherd in love with Alcimadure, but Alcimadure rejects him because she does not believe he is sincere. Jeanet, Alcimadure's brother, claims he can prove that Daphnis' love is true.

Act 2
Jeanet disguises himself as a soldier and comes to find Daphnis. He boasts of his bravery in many battles and says he intends to marry Alcimadure as soon as he has killed a certain shepherd called Daphnis. Daphnis, far from being daunted, declares his love for the shepherdess. Just then, a scream is heard from Alcimadure. She is being chased by a wolf.  Daphnis rushes to the rescue, kills the wolf and saves Alcimadure. Although she is grateful, Alcimadure still rejects his love.

Act 3
Jeanet tries in vain to reason with Alcimadure. Daphnis, in despair, says he wants to die. When Jeanet tells his sister of Daphnis' death, she too says she no longer wants to live. She has secretly been in love with Daphnis. However, Daphnis' supposed death was just a ruse. He is still alive and the couple are now free to love one another.

References
Notes

Bibliography
 Librettos:
 (original libretto, in French and Languedocien) Daphnis et Alcimadure, Pastorale languedocienne, Représentée devant le Roi à Fontainebleau, le 29 Octobre 1754, Paris, Ballard, s.d. (accessible for free online at *Gallica.bnf.fr)
 (1764 Court libretto, in French and Languedocien) Daphnis et Alcimadure, Pastorale languedocienne, Représentée devant leurs Majestés à Versailles, le 12 Décembre 1764, Paris, Ballard, 1764 (accessible for free online at Gallica.bnf.fr)
 (in French and in Toulouse dialect "adjusted to our patois of Montpellier") Daphnis et Alcimaduro: pastouralo toulouzeno, Paris, Didot, 1778 (accessible for free online as a Google ebook–gratis)
 (in Occitan classical norm) Joan Josèp Cassanea de Mondovila e Micolau Fizes, Dafnís e Alcimadura, seguit de l'Operà de Frontinhan (critical edition by Jean Larzac), Montpellier, IEO, 1981.
 « Daphnis et Alcimadure » Opéra occitan et création régionale 26 Juin et 3 Juillet, "Montpellier votre ville", No. 36, June–July 1981, p. 13 (accessible for free online at the site of the commune of Montpellier, montpellier.fr).
 Extraits de Daphnis & Alcimadure, a coeval review in Mercure de France, Dédié au Roi, December 1754, Volume 1, Paris, Chaubert/Nully/Pissot/Duchesne, 1754, pp. 203 et seq. (accessible for free online at Books.google)
 Théodore Lajarte, Bibliothèque Musicale du  Théatre de l'Opéra. Catalogue Historique, Chronologique, Anecdotique, Tome 1, Paris, Librairie des bibliophiles, 1878, pp. 231–232 (accessible online in Internet Archive)
 Spire Pitou, The Paris Opéra. An Encyclopedia of Operas, Ballets, Composers, and Performers – Rococo and Romantic, 1715-1815, Westport/London, Greenwood Press, 1985.

External links 
 Page: Daphnis et Alcimadure, site: "Le magazine de l'opéra baroque"
 Page: Dafnis e Alcimadura, site: "Book in A Tots collection (IEO editions)"

Occitan literature
Occitan-language mass media
Operas by Jean-Joseph Cassanéa de Mondonville
1754 operas
Operas